Jeffrey Thomson (or variants) may refer to:

Jeff Thomson (b. 1950), cricketer
 Jeffery Thompson (b. 1986), American football player and writer
Jeffrey Thomson (artist), awarded Frances Hodgkins Fellowship
Geoff Thomson, cricketer

See also
 Jeff Thompson (disambiguation)
Geoff Thompson (disambiguation)